John Anthony Mallett (born in Lincoln, 28 May 1970) is a former English rugby union footballer. He played as a prop.

Mallett was educated at St Hugh's School, Woodhall Spa until age of 13, he then moved to Millfield and played for Bath Rugby until 2002. Bath won 3 titles in the Guinness Premiership, in 1992/93, 1993/94 and 1995/96, and 3 titles in the Anglo-Welsh Cup, in 1993/94, 1994/95 and 1995/96. Mallet's team also won the Heineken Cup, in 1997/98, for the final of which he was a replacement.

Mallett was selected for England, to take part in the 1995 Rugby World Cup finals; he played a single match against Manu Samoa which proved to be his only appearance for the senior England side. He is now head of rugby at Millfield School, Somerset.

References

External links
John Mallett International Statistics

Living people
People educated at St Hugh's School, Woodhall Spa
People educated at Millfield
1970 births
English rugby union players
Rugby union props
Bath Rugby players
England international rugby union players